Leslie-Alford-Mims House is a historic home located near Holly Springs, Wake County, North Carolina.  The original section of the house was built about 1840, and is a two-story, Greek Revival-style frame dwelling.  The front facade features two-tier, pedimented Doric order entrance portico.  Additions and modifications were made to house about 1876 and 1900, and includes Colonial Revival style design elements.  Also on the property is a contributing family cemetery.

It was listed on the National Register of Historic Places in 1997.

The Leslie-Alford-Mims House is now operated as a wedding venue by Brooke Everhart and Priscilla Erwin.

References

Houses on the National Register of Historic Places in North Carolina
Greek Revival houses in North Carolina
Colonial Revival architecture in North Carolina
Houses completed in 1840
Houses in Wake County, North Carolina
National Register of Historic Places in Wake County, North Carolina